

Places of note 

 J. Neely Johnson House
 Van Voorhies House
 Kuchler Row
 Hubbard-Upson House
 Mesick House
 Anton Wagner Duplex

Further reading 

 Alkali Flat North Historic District, National Register of Historic Places listing
 Alkali Flat West Historic District, National Register of Historic Places listing
 Sacramento's Alkali Flat, James Scott and Tom Tolley, 2010, ISBN 9780738571515

References 

Neighborhoods in Sacramento, California
National Register of Historic Places in Sacramento, California
Historic districts on the National Register of Historic Places in California